Pointer Williams (born 1974) is an American former basketball player. Williams played for McNeese State University. In 1996, he led the NCAA in steals with 116. He later played professionally in Poland and Lithuania.

In 2006, Williams became an assistant coach at Dillard University. In 2011, he became the director of basketball operations at Texas Southern University.

See also
List of NCAA Division I men's basketball season steals leaders

References

External links
 Pointer Williams @ sports-reference.com

1974 births
Living people
American expatriate basketball people in Lithuania
American expatriate basketball people in Poland
American men's basketball coaches
American men's basketball players
Basketball coaches from Louisiana
Basketball players from New Orleans
Dillard Bleu Devils basketball coaches
LSU-Atletas basketball players
McNeese Cowboys basketball players
Point guards
Quad City Thunder players
Texas Southern Tigers men's basketball coaches
Tulane Green Wave men's basketball players